Félix Gras (Malemort-du-Comtat, May 3, 1844 – Avignon, March 4, 1901) was a Provençal poet and novelist.

Biography
Gras was born into a farming family and went to secondary school at the college of Sainte Garde, in Saint Didier. He studied law as a clerk to the notary Jules Giéia in Avignon, later becoming a notary himself, but also enthusiastically attended poetry meetings where he read his first poems. 
  
Soon abandoning his law training, Gras published Li Carbounié (The Charcoal-burners), a rustic epic poem in twelve cantos, in 1876, noted for its "elemental passion" and scenic descriptions, for which he gained immediate recognition.  In 1879, he married the niece of Joseph Roumanille, the husband of his sister Rose Anaïs.  His next work, Toloza, an epic poem about the invasion of the Albigenses by Simon de Montfort, came in 1882, to further acclaim.   He produced a volume of short poems, Li Roumancero Provençal, in 1887, followed by a collection of prose stories, La Paplino, in 1891.

In 1891 (succeeding Joseph Roumanille), Gras was elected 3rd Capoulie (president) of Le Félibre Rouge, a literary and cultural association founded by Frédéric Mistral (1st Capoulie) and other Provençal writers to defend and promote the Provençal language and Provençal literature.  He held this post until his death.

Gras achieved popular success in 1896 with the novel Li Rouge dou Miejour, which was translated into French as Les Rouges du Midi (Reds of the South).  It was praised by former British Prime Minister Gladstone, and was subsequently published in several other languages.  He then wrote a trilogy of tales dealing with the late period of the French Revolution with Li Rouge dóu Miejour (The Reds of the Midi), La Terrour (The Terror) and La Terrour Blanco (The White Terror, which features Napoleon as a character). This series is considered by some to be the most remarkable prose work in the Provençal language.

The epitaph on his tomb, in his native town of Malemort, reads:

Amo moun village maï que toun village, amo ma Provenço maï que ta province, amo la Franço maï que tout !

References

External links
 Félix Gras, poète et écrivain provençal

1844 births
1901 deaths
People from Vaucluse
Occitan-language writers
French poets
French novelists
French historical novelists
Writers of historical fiction set in the early modern period
Writers of historical fiction set in the modern age